This article is a list of historic places in Kings County, Prince Edward Island entered on the Canadian Register of Historic Places, whether they are federal, provincial, or municipal.

List of historic places

See also 
 List of historic places in Prince Edward Island
 List of National Historic Sites of Canada in Prince Edward Island
 Heritage Places Protection Act

Kings County
Kings County
Lime kilns in Canada